Frank Horne could refer to: 

Frank Smith Horne (1899–1974), American poet and government official
Frank Horne (footballer) (1905–1958), Australian rules footballer
Frank Horne (Georgia politician), Democratic member of the 138th Georgia General Assembly from Macon

See also
Frankie Horne (born 1983), South African rugby union player